"Wow" (occasionally stylized as "WOW") is a song by American musician Beck. It is the second single from his thirteenth studio album Colors. Billboard ranked "Wow" at number 60 on their Billboards 100 Best Pop Songs of 2016" list.

Background
Hip hop artist Chance the Rapper was originally intended to make a guest appearance on the track: Beck told NME, "Four or five months ago we tried to get Chance on 'Wow.' I'm not sure what happened with that." A version with rapper Lil Yachty was also recorded.

Usage in media
The song was featured in a 2017 Acura MDX car commercial that debuted in September 2016.

Charts

Weekly charts

Year-end charts

Release history

Certifications

References

Beck songs
2016 songs
American hip hop songs
Alternative hip hop songs
Songs written by Beck
Capitol Records singles
Song recordings produced by Greg Kurstin